The Noire River (in French: rivière Noire) is a tributary of the south bank of the Prévost-Gilbert River which flows on the west bank of the Bras Saint-Victor; the latter in turn empties onto the west bank of the Chaudière River; the latter flows northward to empty on the south shore of the St. Lawrence River. It flows in the municipalities of Adstock (Saint-Method-de-Frontenac sector and Sacré-Cœur-de-Marie-Partie-Sud sector) and Sainte-Clotilde-de-Beauce, in Les Appalaches Regional County Municipality, in the administrative region of Chaudière-Appalaches, in Quebec, in Canada.

Geography 
The main neighboring watersheds of the Black River are:
 north side: Prévost-Gilbert River, Nadeau River;
 east side: Prévost-Gilbert River, Bras Saint-Victor, Giguère-Fortin stream, Chaudière River;
 south side: Bras Fortin-Dupuis, Tardif-Bizier stream, Muskrat River;
 west side: Palmer East River, Whetstone River.

From its source, the Black River flows on  divided into the following segments:
  towards the north, to the limit between Adstock (Saint-Method-de-Frontenac sector) and Saint-Cœur-de-Marie-Partie-Sud de Adstock;
  northeasterly, up to the municipal limit of Sainte-Clotilde-de-Beauce;
  north-east, passing south of Mont Le Grand Morne, to its confluence.

The Black River flows in a caves valley. It empties on the south shore of the Prévost-Gilbert river in the municipality of Sainte-Clotilde-de-Beauce.

Toponymy 
The toponym Rivière Noire was formalized on August 17, 1978, at the Commission de toponymie du Québec.

See also 
 List of rivers of Quebec

References 

Rivers of Chaudière-Appalaches
Les Appalaches Regional County Municipality